Mikhaylovka is a rural locality (a selo) and the administrative centre of Mikhaylovsky Selsoviet, Duvansky District, Bashkortostan, Russia. The population was 994 as of 2010. There are 11 streets.

Geography 
Mikhaylovka is located 23 km northwest of Mesyagutovo (the district's administrative centre) by road. Ignashkino is the nearest rural locality.

References 

Rural localities in Duvansky District